Paracaroides is a genus of moths of the family Noctuidae.

Species
Paracaroides befasy  Viette, 1960
Paracaroides behara 	Viette, 1960
Paracaroides janineae 	Viette, 1958
Paracaroides louveli 	Viette, 1969
Paracaroides pauliani	Viette, 1958
Paracaroides pratti Kenrick, 1917
Paracaroides sublota 	(Mabille, 1900)	
Paracaroides vaovao  Viette, 1972

References

Natural History Museum Lepidoptera genus database

Hadeninae
Noctuoidea genera